Xia Huang (born January 1962) is a Chinese diplomat who currently serves as Special Envoy of the Secretary-General of the United Nations for the Great Lakes Region, a position he took up on April 1, 2019.

Biography
Xia was born in Zhu County, Hebei, in January 1962. After the Resumption of College Entrance Examination in 1980, he entered the China Foreign Affairs University, where he graduated in August 1985. He went to the Law School of the University of Liège in Belgium for further study. After university, he interned at the Chinese Embassy in Belgium.

Xia returned to China in January 1987 and that same year became an official in the Ministry of Foreign Affairs. In August 1990 he was sent to Gabon, where he worked as an attaché. In September 1996, he was accepted to the École nationale d'administration and graduated in February 1998. Then he worked in the Translation Office of the Ministry of Foreign Affairs.

He was counsellor of the Chinese Embassy in France in June 2002, and held that office until July 2007. Then he served as an official in the Standing Committee of the CPC Jiamusi Municipal Committee. In November 2009 he was appointed Chinese Ambassador to Niger, a position he held until October 2012, when he was transferred to Senegal and appointed the Chinese Ambassador. In October 2015 he became Chinese Ambassador to the Republic of Congo, and served until May 2018. He was appointed Special Envoy of the Secretary-General of the United Nations for the Great Lakes Region in January 2019 by U.N. Secretary-General António Guterres.

References

1962 births
People from Baoding
Living people
China Foreign Affairs University alumni
University of Liège alumni
École nationale d'administration alumni
Ambassadors of China to Senegal
Ambassadors of China to Niger
Special Envoys of the Secretary-General of the United Nations